Ziman is a surname. Notable people with the surname include:

John Ziman (1925–2005), British-born New Zealand physicist and humanist
Richard Ziman (born 1942), American real estate investor, philanthropist, and political donor

See also
Zisman